The Rialto Theater was a movie theater at 1424 Douglas Street in Downtown Omaha, Nebraska.  The building was razed in 1986 and the site paved over for use as a parking lot.   The property was later redeveloped as part of the construction of the Union Pacific Railroad's headquarters building.

History 

The 2,500-seat theater was designed by John Latenser & Sons for the Blank Realty Company.  The general contractor was Calvin Ziegler.  The theater was of steel frame construction with concrete and masonry walls.   The theater's exterior was of old ivory and terra cotta, with accents of polychrome blues and reds.  There were three prominent arches for advertising over the theater's diagonal corner entrance.  Features included a nursery with an attendant, a screening room and large orchestra space with a pipe organ.  Store fronts were built along the street level and business offices were available on the second level.   The total investment in the building and its outfitting was estimated in 1917 at $300,000.

The theater, built primarily for movies, opened to the public on Memorial Day, May 30, 1918.   The inaugural movie was Raffles, the Amateur Cracksman, starring John Barrymore and Evelyn Brent.  Initially built for silent movies, the theater was eventually converted to talking movies.   The theater closed suddenly on August 2, 1929 and was subsequently sub-divided into several retail establishments.   Its later uses included a bus station, a bowling alley, a retail clothing store and a cafeteria before its eventual demolition in February 1986.  The theater's large organ was acquired by Omaha Central High School with plans to install it in the school's auditorium.   That plan was never executed upon and the organ was later dismantled and sold for scrap.

In Season 1, Episode 14, “The Phantom of the Horse Opera,” of the television program, “That Girl”, the Rialto theater is mentioned in the dialogue. One of the characters owns an old organ, and he mentions acquiring it from “...The Rialto Theater in Omaha, NE...”

See also
 List of theaters in Omaha, Nebraska

References

External links 
 Rialto Theater at Cinema Treasures
 Street View of Rialto Theater

Theatres in Omaha, Nebraska
Theatres completed in 1918
History of Omaha, Nebraska
Downtown Omaha, Nebraska
Demolished buildings and structures in Omaha, Nebraska
Cinemas and movie theaters in Nebraska
Buildings and structures demolished in 1986